Rhinoneura is a genus of damselflies in the family Chlorocyphidae. There are only two species in the genus, both believed to be occur only the highlands of north Borneo.

The genus contains the following species:
Rhinoneura caerulea 
Rhinoneura villosipes

References

Chlorocyphidae
Zygoptera genera